Graham Jarvis (born 21 April 1975) in Ripon, North Yorkshire is an Extreme Enduro rider.

His achievements include winning the Scottish Six Days Trial four times and the Scott Trial nine times, more times than any competitor in the event's history. He has been the British Trials Champion five times.

More recently he has continued on to success within the Extreme Enduro segment placing prominently in several high-profile events. He has been the winner of Red Bull Romaniacs seven times, the Erzberg Rodeo Red Bull Hare Scramble five times, the Red Bull Sea to Sky six times, and the Winner Hells Gate five times.

As of August 2018 Graham Jarvis is a Factory Team Rider for Husqvarna Motorcycles riding a Husqvarna Factory Racing TE 300i

References
6. Red bull athlete profile, https://www.redbull.com/au-en/athlete/jonny-walker Retrieved 09/09/2022.

External links
Official Site - Graham Jarvis

Living people
1975 births
Motorcycle trials riders